Ernst is the second album by Matt Nathanson. It was released in February 1997 on Acrobat Records.

Track listing 
 "First Time" – 4:00
 "Church Clothes" – 3:03
 "We'll Recover" – 3:12
 "Measure for Measure" – 3:19
 "New Coats and New Hats" – 3:07
 "All Been Said Before" – 3:11
 "Wide Eyed and Full" – 3:51
 "Miracles" – 3:58
 "Somewhere to Hide" – 3:15
 "Maid" – 4:28

References
 Matt Nathanson official site

1999 albums
Matt Nathanson albums